Madonna and Child is a c. 1459-1460 painting by Giorgio Schiavone, produced during his time in Francesco Squarcione's studio in Padua. It is signed on a cartouche on the fictive marble balustrade at the base "HOC PINSIT GEORGIUS DALMATICUS DISCIPULUS SQUARCIONIS" (Giorgio Schiavone, pupil of Squarcione, painted this). Two angel musicians also sit on the balustrade.

The work appeared on the art market in 1922 and was bought by Henry Walters three years later. It is now in the Walters Art Museum.

External links
Walters Art Museum

Schiavone
1459 paintings
1460 paintings
Croatian paintings
Italian paintings
Paintings in the collection of the Walters Art Museum
Angels in art